The Prince Edward Island Cables connect the electric grid on Prince Edward Island with the mainland in New Brunswick. The cost was $142.5 million shared by federal ($68.9 million) and provincial ($73.6 million) governments. The project was run by Maritime Electric.

The cables replaced two oil-filled three-phase cables at 138 kV with a capacity of 100 MW each taken into operation in October 1977, providing the first connection to the mainland grid. They were ordered from the Swedish company  in 1974. In order to not disturb the fishing of scallops in Northumberland Strait, a special plough was constructed to place the cables deep enough in the bottom.

References 

Buildings and structures in Prince Edward Island
Buildings and structures in New Brunswick
Submarine cables